Franz-Ulrich Hartl (born 10 March 1957) is a German biochemist and Managing Director of the Max Planck Institute of Biochemistry. He is known for his pioneering work in the field of protein-mediated protein folding and is a recipient of the 2011 Lasker Award along with Arthur L. Horwich.

Biography 
Hartl was born in Essen, Germany on 10 March 1957. He completed his M.D. (1982) and Dr. med. (1985) at the University of Heidelberg. His thesis was entitled The Regulation of Rat Liver Peroxisomal Metabolism by Thyroid Hormones. He then completed his Dr. Med. Habil. from the Institute of Physiological Chemistry, University of Munich in 1990. He was a postdoctoral fellow at the Institute of Physiological Chemistry at the University of Munich in the lab of Walter Neupert from 1985 to 1986, and a postdoctoral fellow at the University of California, Los Angeles in the lab of William T. Wickner from 1989 to 1990.

In 1991, he accepted a professorship in cell biology and genetics at Memorial Sloan-Kettering Cancer Center and Cornell Medical College in New York, until his return to Germany in 1997 to take up his present position as Director of the Max Planck Institute of Biochemistry, Martinsried.

, Hartl has an h-index of 140 according to Google Scholar and of 122 according to Scopus.

Honors 
Hartl received the following honors:

 1996 Vinci Award, LVMH Science for Art competition
 1997 Lipmann Award of the American Society for Biochemistry and Molecular Biology
 1997 Foreign Member of the Academy of Science of Nordrhein-Westfalen
 1999 Academy Award of the Berlin-Brandenburg Academy of Sciences and Humanities
 2000 Wilhelm Vaillant Research Prize
 2000 Foreign Honorary Member of the American Academy of Arts and Sciences
 2002 Gottfried Wilhelm Leibniz-Prize of the Deutsche Forschungsgemeinschaft (German Research Council)
 2002 Member of the German Academy of Sciences Leopoldina
 2003 Feldberg Prize
 2004 Member of the Bavarian Academy of Sciences
 2004 Gairdner Foundation International Award jointly with Arthur L. Horwich
 2005 Ernst Jung Prize for Medicine
 2006 Stein and Moore Award of the Protein Society
 2006 Körber European Science Award
 2007 Wiley Prize in Biomedical Science jointly with Arthur L. Horwich of Yale School of Medicine, "for their significant contribution in protein folding".
 2008 Lewis S. Rosenstiel Award for Distinguished Work in Basic Medical Research jointly with Arthur L. Horwich "for their pioneering work in the field of protein-mediated protein folding"
 2008 Louisa Gross Horwitz Prize (Columbia University) for Biology or Biochemistry jointly with Arthur L. Horwich
 2008 Honorary Member, Japanese Biochemical Society
 2009 Otto Warburg Medal of the German Society for Biochemistry and Molecular Biology (GBM)
 2010 Elected as AAAS Fellow
 2010 van Gysel Prize for Biomedical Research in Europe
 2010 The Twenty-Seventh Annual Cynthia Ann Chan Memorial Lecture, University of California, Berkeley
 2010 The Dr H.P. Heineken Prize for Biochemistry and Biophysics, Royal Netherlands Academy of Arts and Sciences
 2011 The Albert Lasker Award for Basic Medical Research
 2011 Elected to the National Academy of Sciences, USA, Foreign associate
 2011 Massry Prize from the Keck School of Medicine, University of Southern California
 2012 The Shaw Prize in medicine
 2016 Albany Medical Center Prize
 2016 Ernst Schering Prize
 2017 Debrecen award for Molecular Medicine
 2019 Dr. Paul Janssen Award for Biomedical Research, jointly with Arthur Horwich, from Johnson & Johnson 
 2020 Breakthrough Prize in Life Sciences

References

External links

 

1957 births
German biochemists
Heidelberg University alumni
Ludwig Maximilian University of Munich alumni
Cornell University faculty
Gottfried Wilhelm Leibniz Prize winners
Winners of the Heineken Prize
Living people
Recipients of the Albert Lasker Award for Basic Medical Research
Foreign associates of the National Academy of Sciences
Massry Prize recipients
Max Planck Institute directors